Claudio Lombardelli (born 14 October 1987) is a Luxembourgian football player, who currently plays for Jeunesse d'Esch in the Luxembourg National Division.

Club career
Lombardelli started his career at FC Schifflange 95 before joining Jeunesse in summer 2004.

International career
He made his debut for Luxembourg in a June 2006 friendly match against Portugal, coming on as a late substitute for René Peters. By December 2008 he had earned 20 caps, scoring no goals. He played in 3 FIFA World Cup qualification matches.

External links

References

1987 births
Living people
Sportspeople from Esch-sur-Alzette
Luxembourgian footballers
Jeunesse Esch players
Luxembourg international footballers
Association football midfielders